The Battle of Nedao was a battle fought in Pannonia in 454 between the Huns and their former Germanic vassals. Nedao is believed to be a tributary of the Sava River.

Battle
After the death of Attila the Hun, allied forces of the subject peoples under the leadership of Ardaric, king of the Gepids, defeated the Hunnic forces of Ellac, the son of Attila, who had struggled with his brothers Ernak and Dengizich for supremacy after Attila's death. Ellac himself was killed in the battle.

According to the 6th-century historian Jordanes:
And so the bravest nations tore themselves to pieces. For then, I think, must have occurred a most remarkable spectacle, where one might see the Goths fighting with pikes, the Gepidae raging with the sword, the Rugii breaking off the spears in their own wounds, the Suavi fighting on foot, the Huns with bows, the Alani drawing up a battle-line of heavy-armed and the Heruli of light-armed warriors.

Modern views
Jordanes claimed that at the Battle of Nedao the Ostrogoths fought against the Huns, but this is rejected by modern historians such as Herwig Wolfram and Hyun Jin Kim. The latter believes that this is a forged story and that the Ostrogoth king Valamir himself fought alongside the Huns. Alternatively, J.R. Martindale and Franz Altheim accept that the Ostrogoths were among the victors of Nedao, while many others, including Otto J. Maenchen-Helfen, believe that they did not participate at all.

Aftermath
Hunnic dominance in Central and Eastern Europe was broken as a result of the battle. It is hard to reconstruct the exact course of events, but by the early 460s the Hunnic Empire was dissolved with the Gepids, Rugii, Heruli, Suebi, and Ostrogoths achieving independence and eventually becoming federates of the Eastern Roman Empire. The Huns, reorganized under Dengizich, moved to the east, where they attacked the Eastern Roman Empire and were decisively defeated in 469. After that point, the Huns cease to exist in European history.

See also
The Battle of the Goths and Huns

References

Sources

Herwig Wolfram. History of the Goths, transl. Thomas J. Dunlap., University of California Press, 1990, .

454
450s conflicts
Battles involving Russia
Battles involving Germany
Battles involving the Huns
Battles involving the Ostrogoths
Battles involving the Suebi
Battles involving the Heruli